Coronel Du Graty  is a small city and municipality in Chaco Province in northern Argentina. There is no foundation date but the name Coronel Du Graty was assigned by national decree on January 26, 1942 and this date is used as the foundation.

Name 
The name of the Belgian Colonel Alfredo Marbais, Baron Du Graty, was awarded on January 26, 1942, by national decree 112.231, signed by Vice President Ramón Castillo, designating it the "railway station" in "spot detour km 23.

References

Populated places in Chaco Province